Swarnakamalam is a 1988 Indian Telugu-language dance film written and directed by K. Viswanath. The film stars Venkatesh and Bhanupriya  in the lead, while Sharon Lowen appears in a special role. The choreography is helmed by Kelucharan Mohapatra, and Sharon Lowen with soundtrack by Ilaiyaraaja. The song sequences were extensively shot at the Valley of Flowers National Park, the Nanda Devi National Park, the Shanti Stupa and Bhringesvara Siva Temple at Dhauli; and other locations in Visakhapatnam.

Featured in the Indian panorama section of the 12th IFFI, the Asia Pacific Film Festival and the Ann Arbor Film Festival, it fetched three Indian Express Awards, three state Nandi Awards, and two South Filmfare Awards, including Nandi Award for Best Feature Film and Filmfare Best Film Award (Telugu).

Plot

Meenakshi (Bhanupriya) and Savitri (Devilalita) are daughters of a Kuchipudi doyen,  Vedantam Seshendra Sharma. While a highly accomplished artist in his field, Seshendra Sharma is not well-off and has not been able to afford for his daughters, a conventional education. Both of them have achieved a respectable degree of proficiency — Savitri in Carnatic classical music and Meenakshi in classical dance.

Savitri, the elder daughter, is grateful for her knowledge and interest and looks forward to a life that will require her to hone her skills in the art. Meenakshi, on the other hand, is bitter about the lack of opportunity that she feels in the field of classical dance in India and resolves to make a simpler and more pleasurable life for herself as soon as possible, while confiding her ambitions only to her sister.

Chandrasekhar (Venkatesh) is a tenant who has just moved in next door. He is a painter and is shown to be handling movie promotions as a large part of his work. He develops an interest in the neighbors and tries to help them in whatever way he can, partly because of his (unconfessed) interest in Meenakshi and partly because of his interest in the art which seems to be slowly fading from public life.

The rest of the film is largely built around Meenakshi's journey from skepticism to devotion in her pursuit of dance. Chandrasekhar is shown to be an important catalyst in this transformation. Meenakshi becomes an accomplished dancer through the direction of renowned Odissi dancer Sharon Lowen, and gets the opportunity to go to the United States and perform. She learns of Chandrasekhar's love for her, and finally unites with Chandrasekhar, confessing her love for him as well.

Cast
 Venkatesh as Chandu / Chandra Shekar
 Bhanupriya as Meenakshi
 Shanmukha Srinivas as Srinivas
 Sakshi Ranga Rao as Omkaram
 Sri Lakshmi as Akhilam
 S. K. Misro as Government official
 Devilalita as Savitri
 Dubbing Janaki 
 Pavala Syamala
 Sharon Lowen as herself
Aruna Macherla as Meenakshi's friend
 K. V. Satyanarayana
 Vinnakota Vijayaram
 N. Sivarama Krishnaiah
 K. S. T. Sai
 S. S. Vajpayee

Production
The production design was helmed by Arun D. Ghodgaonkar, with cinematography by Lok Singh. Casting was done by K. Viswanath, including American dancer Sharon Lowen, who portrayed herself as a veteran Odissi artist.

Soundtrack
The music for the film was composed by Ilaiyaraaja and released on ECHO Music Company.

Awards
Nandi Awards - 1988
 Best Feature Film - Gold - Ch.V. Appa Rao
 Best Actress - Bhanupriya
 Best Choreographer - Srinivas
 Best Lyricist - Sirivennela Seetharama Sastry
Filmfare Awards South - 1988
 Best Film – Telugu - Ch.V. Appa Rao
 Best Actress – Telugu - Bhanupriya

Cinema Express Awards - 1988
 Cinema Express Awards Best Film - Ch.V. Appa Rao 
 Cinema Express Awards Best Director - K. Viswanath
 Cinema Express Awards Best Actress - Bhanupriya

References

External links
 

1988 films
1980s Telugu-language films
1980s dance films
Films directed by K. Viswanath
Indian dance films
Films about the arts
Films about fictional painters
Films about classical music and musicians
Films shot in Odisha
Films scored by Ilaiyaraaja
Indian romantic drama films
Films shot in Uttarakhand
Films shot in Visakhapatnam
1988 romantic drama films